The 36th National Film Awards, presented by Ministry of Information, Bangladesh to felicitate the best of Bangladeshi Cinema released in the year 2011. The awards in the ceremony were given by then President of Bangladesh. 24 artistes and others were given the National Film Awards 2011 in recognition of their outstanding contributions to the country's film industry. Guerrilla, the 2011 film on the Liberation War, won 10 awards – including best film, best director and best actress.

Awards

Merit Awards

Technical Awards

Special Awards
Lifetime Achievement Award – Abdur Razzak
 Best Documentary Film – Al-Badar (Fokhrul Arefin) and Lokonayak Kangal Harinath (Directorate of Film and Publicity)

Jury Board
The government had constituted a 13-member jury board with an additional secretary of the ministry of information as president and vice-chairman of Bangladesh Film Censor Board (BFSB) as member secretary for awarding the National Film Awards 2011.
The jury board recommended for the award after examining eligibility to get the award in different categories by 30 September 2012.
The first meeting of the jury board was held at BFSB boardroom in the capital Dhaka and Jury board president M Hafizur Rahman presided over the meeting.

See also
Meril Prothom Alo Awards
Ifad Film Club Award
Babisas Award

References

External links

National Film Awards (Bangladesh) ceremonies
2011 film awards
2013 awards in Bangladesh
2013 in Dhaka
January 2013 events in Bangladesh